Primrose may refer to:

Botany
 Primulaceae, a family of flowering plants
 Primula vulgaris, commonly known as the primrose (also called the common primrose or English primrose)
 Oenothera, commonly known as evening primrose, a plant genus
 Onagraceae, commonly known as the willowherb family or evening primrose family

Places
Britain
 Primrose Hill in London
Canada
 Primrose Lake on the Alberta/Saskatchewan border
South Africa
 Primrose, Gauteng
United States
 Primrose, Alaska
 Primrose, Georgia
 Primrose, Kentucky
 Primrose, Nebraska
 Primrose, Ohio
 Primrose, Pennsylvania
 Primrose, Rhode Island
 Primrose, Wisconsin, a town
 Primrose (community), Wisconsin, an unincorporated community

People

Families 
 Clan Primrose, a Scottish clan headed by the Earl of Rosebery
Earl of Rosebery, a title linked with the Clan Primrose 
Laird of Burnbrae, a title linked with the Clan Primrose

Surname
 Archibald Primrose (disambiguation), various people
 Delphi Primrose (b. 2003), Scottish model
 Francis Ward Primrose (1785–1860), M.P. for Stirling District of Burghs
 George Anson Primrose (1849–1930), Vice-Admiral in the Royal Navy 
 George Primrose, member of the blackface song-and-dance team Primrose and West
 Gilbert E. Primrose (1848–1935), Scottish international footballer
 John Primrose (disambiguation), various people
 Henry Primrose (1846–1923),  Scottish civil servant who became Chairman of the Board of Inland Revenue
 Hannah Primrose, Countess of Rosebery
 Neil Primrose (musician), Scottish drummer with the rock band Travis
 Patrick Primrose (c. 1605–1671), Scottish Roman Catholic priest
 William Primrose, a violist

First name
 Primrose ("Prim") Everdeen, Katniss's sister in The Hunger Games trilogy

Other
 Primrose (musical), a musical comedy
 Primrose Brook, a tributary of the Passaic River
 Primrose Day, the anniversary of the death of British prime minister Benjamin Disraeli
 Primrose League, an organisation founded in 1883 to promote Toryism
 Primrose High School, an 11-19 comprehensive school in Leeds, UK
 Operation Primrose, the code name later given to the capture of German submarine U-110
 Primrose, a video game for the Nintendo DSi
 , several Royal Navy ships
 MV Primrose, a freight and passenger ferry
 MV Primrose, a Hong Kong freighter grounded on North Sentinel Island.

See also 

 
 Primrose Path (disambiguation)

Given names derived from plants or flowers
English-language surnames
Scottish surnames